Kóspallag is a village in Pest county, Hungary.

References

External links
 Kóspallag in wiki.utikonyvem.hu

Populated places in Pest County